Veppanahalli is a state assembly constituency of Tamil Nadu, India, that was formed after constituency delimitation in 2007. Its State Assembly Constituency number is 54. Located in Krishnagiri district, it comprises portions of the Hosur, Denkanikottai, and Krishnagiri taluks. The constituency is part of Krishnagiri parliamentary constituency for elections to the Parliament of India. It is one of the 234 State Legislative Assembly Constituencies in Tamil Nadu in India.

Members of Legislative Assembly

Election results

2021

2016

2011

References

Assembly constituencies of Tamil Nadu
Krishnagiri district